DXCT (106.5 FM) Radyo Pilipinas is a radio station owned and operated by the City Government of Tangub. Its studios and transmitter are located at Maloro Beach, Tangub.

References

External links
Radyo Pilipinas Tangub FB Page

Radio stations in Misamis Occidental
Radio stations established in 2007